HMS Malabar was a Euphrates-class troopship launched in 1866, and the fifth ship of the Royal Navy to employ the name. She was designed to carry troops between the United Kingdom and British India, and was employed in that role for most of her life.  She became the base ship (or depot ship) at the Royal Naval Dockyard, Bermuda in 1897 (replacing the previous depot ship, HMS Terror (1856)), was renamed HMS Terror in 1901 and was sold in 1918.  Her name was later used as the stone frigate to which shore personnel in Bermuda were enrolled, and later for Her Majesty's Naval Base Bermuda, after the 1950s, when the dockyard was reduced to a base.

Design
Malabar was one of five iron-hulled vessels of the Euphrates class. All five were built to a design of 360 ft overall length by about 49 ft breadth, although Malabar was very slightly smaller than the rest of the class. They had  a single screw, a speed of 14 knots, one funnel, a barque-rig sail plan, three 4-pounder guns, and a white painted hull. Her bow was a "ram bow" which projected forward below the waterline.

Identification
The Euphrates-class troopships could each be identified by a different coloured hull band. The Malabars hull band was black. The blue hull band of her sister Euphrates became the standard for all HM Troopships.

Career
She was built for the transport of troops between the United Kingdom and the Indian sub-continent, and was operated by the Royal Navy. She carried up to 1,200 troops and family on a passage of approximately 70 days.

In common with her sisters she was re-engined, her single-expansion steam engine being replaced with a Napier 2-cylinder compound-expansion engine in 1873.

She was taken in tow by the steamship Benjamin Whitworth, which with the assistance of two Admiralty tugs took her in to Plymouth, Devon. In 1878 or early 1879 she grounded in Whitsand Bay near Plymouth. Her commanding officer, Captain Percy Luxmoore, was dismissed from the ship and replaced by Captain John Grant.

Fate
She became the depot ship at Bermuda in 1897 and was renamed HMS Terror on 1 May 1905; the name Malabar was later used by the Royal Naval dockyard at Bermuda.  Terror was sold in January 1918.

Commanding officers

Notes

References

 

Troop ships of the Royal Navy
Euphrates-class troopships
Ships built in Leamouth
Victorian-era naval ships of the United Kingdom
1866 ships
Maritime incidents in November 1878